Annemarie Lewis Thomas is a Musical Director, Composer, Lyricist and the Principal/Founder of the Musical Theatre Academy (MTA), named by The Stage as School of the Year in 2012 and 2017.

Early career
Originally from Swansea, Annemarie trained at Middlesex Polytechnic, getting a degree in Performing Arts.
After graduating she was the MD for the critically acclaimed fringe company The Steam Industry. During her tenure as the MD/Arranger for the Steam Industry she was responsible for such hits as Seven Brides for Seven Brothers, The King & I, The Sound of Music and the UK stage premiere of Calamity Jane  all at BAC. Eventually Willmott and Lewis Thomas started to create their own shows includingUncle Ebenezer, Around the World in 80 Days (which went on to have a short UK and a large German tour), and Wolf Boys (commissioned by the Yvonne Arnaud Youth Theatre).   Having worked on over 20 shows with Phil Willmott, including the first original production of Rent outside of Broadway, which she was given permission to re-arrange. Annemarie moved into composing & lyric writing.  Writing with Phil Willmott, Around The World in 80 Days was quick to receive a publishing deal with Samuel French. . She was commissioned to write the music for Black Eyed Susan which reopened the Theatre Royal Bury St Edmunds after its much-lauded renovation. She was then commissioned to write three pantomimes for the theatre.

In total Annemarie has written the music to seven pantomimes and has written 16 full-length musicals – all of which have been performed by major companies. Regularly commissioned by YMT:UK most recently she has been writing with award-winning book writer Nick Stimson. Together they have now written six musicals, all of which have obtained great critical reviews. Dangerous Daughters, the story of the Suffragette movement, through the eyes of the Pankhurst family was published by Samuel French in 2018.

In 2011 Trinity Guildhall Musical Theatre Examination Board, chose A Common Man from Great Expectations as one of their Syllabus pieces

Teaching
A former Head of Musical Theatre at the Hertfordshire Theatre School a module leader at Middlesex University,, ' Annemarie has always taught alongside her professional commitments. In 2009 she opened her own college The MTA. Since opening the college has received a constant stream of critical press, praising its innovative approach to drama training. In 2012 it was named as The Stage School of the Year with the citation calling it a 'new force for drama training in the UK' and in 2017 it was awarded the title for an unprecedented 2nd time. Once again the citation acknowledged its groundbreaking approach, noting that its graduates were now regularly appearing in top professional productions. However the award was specifically given for the work that the college had done to promote Mental Health Awareness in the Arts. The MTA closed in September 2022

Writer/commentator
Annemarie is an accomplished writer, regularly being asked to contribute articles/features to arts magazines, websites. For a number of years she wrote for the Review Hub, until in 2015 she opted for complete editorial control with her own blog (which has now turned into vlogging on her own YouTube channel). She now writes as 'an expert' on the Backstage.com website and has manned their 'Office Hours' forum on a few occasions   Known to be outspoken on the topic of Mental Health in the Arts, in March 2015 she organised the first conference for drama schools to discuss the issue. As a direct result of the conference, Annemarie, along with The MTA's Mental Health consultant, Angie Peake, created the #time4change Mental Health Charter. Launched by Mark Shenton in The Stage in July 2016. By December 2016, 115 major arts organisations had signed up to the charter.

Musicals
 Uncle Ebenezer                     Book, Lyrics by Phil Willmott. Music by Annemarie Lewis Thomas (based on tunes by traditional songs)
 Around the World in 80 Days        Book, Lyrics by Phil Willmott. Music by Annemarie Lewis Thomas (based on tunes by Phil Willmott)*
 Wolfboys                           Book, Lyrics by Phil Willmott. Music by Annemarie Lewis Thomas (based on tunes by Phil Willmott)
 Great Expectations                 Book by Gerry Flanagan. Music & Lyrics by Annemarie Lewis Thomas
 Fool's Gold                        Book by Gerry Flanagan. Music & Lyrics by Annemarie Lewis Thomas
 Dangerous Daughters                Book by Nick Stimson. Music & Lyrics by Annemarie Lewis Thomas*
 Celebs Anon                        Book by Nick Stimson. Music & Lyrics by Annemarie Lewis Thomas
 The Sunshine Gang                  Book by Nick Stimson. Music & Lyrics by Annemarie Lewis Thomas
 The Ballad of Kitty Jay            Book by Nick Stimson. Music & Lyrics by Annemarie Lewis Thomas
 Tickets Please                     Book by Nick Stimson. Music & Lyrics by Annemarie Lewis Thomas
 The Venus Factor                   Book by Nick Stimson. Music & Lyrics by Annemarie Lewis Thomas
 Oh My, Nellie Bly                  Book by Nick Stimson. Music & Lyrics by Annemarie Lewis Thomas*
 * Published by Concord Theatrical UK

Pantomimes
 Cinderella                         Book by Daniel O'Brien Music & Lyrics by Annemarie Lewis Thomas
 Puss in Boots                      Book by Daniel O'Brien Music & Lyrics by Annemarie Lewis Thomas
 Jack and the Beanstalk             Book by Daniel O'Brien Music & Lyrics by Annemarie Lewis Thomas
 Aladdin                            Book by Daniel O'Brien Music & Lyrics by Annemarie Lewis Thomas
 Mother Goose                      Book by Daniel O'Brien Music & Lyrics by Annemarie Lewis Thomas
 Robinson Crusoe                    Book by Daniel O'Brien Music & Lyrics by Annemarie Lewis Thomas
 Dick Whittington and his Cat                    Book by Daniel O'Brien Music & Lyrics by Annemarie Lewis Thomas

Films 

 Coming Home                    Screenplay by Nick Stimson Music & Lyrics by Annemarie Lewis Thomas
 J                                         Screenplay by Nick Stimson Music & Lyrics by Annemarie Lewis Thomas**

** Winner of 12 Laurels on the Film Festival Circuit, including a Bronze award for Annemarie's lyric and song writing

References

Welsh composers
Living people
Year of birth missing (living people)